Patrick Gretsch (born 7 April 1987) is a German former professional cyclist, who rode professionally between 2006 and 2016 for the , ,  and  teams.

Major results

2004
 1st  Time trial, UCI Junior Road World Championships
 1st  Time trial, National Junior Road Championships
2005
 1st Stage 3 (ITT) Trofeo Karlsberg
2006
 7th Overall 3-Länder-Tour
2007
 10th Overall Rás Tailteann
2008
 1st  Overall Thüringen Rundfahrt der U23
1st Stage 5 (ITT)
 2nd  Time trial, UCI Under-23 Road World Championships
2009
 1st  Time trial, National Under-23 Road Championships
 3rd  Time trial, UCI Under-23 Road World Championships
 4th Overall Thüringen Rundfahrt der U23
 9th Rund um Köln
2010
 2nd Time trial, National Road Championships
2011
 1st Prologue Ster ZLM Toer
 1st Prologue USA Pro Cycling Challenge
 1st Stage 1 (TTT) Giro d'Italia
 3rd Time trial, National Road Championships
2012
 1st Prologue Vuelta a Andalucía
2013
 2nd Time trial, National Road Championships
 4th Overall Tour of Alberta

Grand Tour general classification results timeline

References

External links

1987 births
Living people
German male cyclists
Sportspeople from Erfurt
Cyclists from Thuringia
21st-century German people